Current Cancer Drug Targets is a peer-reviewed medical journal published by Bentham Science Publishers. The editor-in-chief is Ruiwen Zhang (UH Drug Discovery Institute). The journal covers research on contemporary molecular drug targets involved in cancer, including medicinal chemistry, pharmacology, molecular biology, genomics, and biochemistry. Current Cancer Drug Targets publishes original research reports, review papers, and rapid communications ("letters").

Abstracting and indexing
Current Cancer Drug Targets is abstracted and indexed in:
Chemical Abstracts Service/CASSI
EMBASE
EMBiology
MEDLINE
Science Citation Index Expanded
Scopus
According to the Journal Citation Reports, the journal has a 2019 impact factor of 2.912.

References

External links

Oncology journals
Bentham Science Publishers academic journals
Publications established in 2001
English-language journals
11 times per year journals